The Princess and the Pauper is a 1939 Technicolor cartoon sponsored film by Chevrolet. It features Nicky Nome, who also appeared in the previous Chevrolet films A Coach for Cinderella and A Ride for Cinderella, as well as One Bad Knight,  Nicky Rides Again and Peg-Leg Pedro. The Princess and the Pauper is in the public domain and runs for approximately ten minutes.

Plot summary
A king offers his daughter's hand in marriage to the wealthiest suitor in the kingdom. She is wooed by the despicable wizard Ali Kazam, but falls for a pauper boy with a yo-yo. The boy is kicked out of the palace by the king's men, whereupon the diminutive magical creature Nicky Nome appears to help him, giving him a flying carpet to travel to a valley of jewels. When Ali Kazam attacks on a vulture, Nicky gradually transforms the carpet into a Chevrolet motor car.

See also
 A Coach for Cinderella
 A Ride for Cinderella
 Peg-Leg Pedro
 Jam Handy 
 Advertising
 Sponsored film
 List of films in the public domain in the United States

Notes

External links
 
 
 Vimeo

1939 films
1939 animated films
American animated short films
Sponsored films
1930s American animated films
Articles containing video clips
Jam Handy Organization films
Promotional films